Sounds Incorporated, first recorded as Sounds Inc., was a British instrumental pop/rock group which recorded extensively in the 1960s.

Career
Sounds Incorporated formed in early 1961, in Dartford, Kent, and gained a reputation in nearby South London for the fullness of their saxophone-led instrumental sound. In August 1961, after Gene Vincent's band, The Blue Caps, had been denied permission to work in the UK, Sounds Incorporated won the opportunity to back Vincent on his British tour and on recordings in London. This led to further opportunities to back other visiting American artists, including Little Richard, Jerry Lee Lewis, Brenda Lee and Sam Cooke.

Their only record with Parlophone, "Mogambo", failed to achieve significant sales. The band then moved to Decca, where they released a trio of singles, the last of which was recorded with producer Joe Meek, again with little success. However, while performing in Hamburg in Germany, they met and befriended the Beatles and in 1963 signed to Brian Epstein's management company, NEMS. In the same year, they appeared as musical guests in the film Live It Up!

The band's first two singles on new label Columbia, "The Spartans" and "Spanish Harlem", made the UK Singles Chart in 1964. These were the only successes that Sounds Incorporated enjoyed in their home country. That same year they became Cilla Black's backing band, and released their first album called Sounds Incorporated. It contained many stage favourites, but not their recent chart successes. The group's third Columbia single, a version of the "William Tell Overture", was included and turned out to be their greatest success in Australia, where it reached number 2.

The group toured the world as the Beatles' opening act, including the August 1965 concert at New York City's Shea Stadium. Sounds Incorporated's continuing popularity ensured a stream of work, including backing duties at the televised NME awards. In December 1964, NME reported that Sounds Incorporated would appear at the Hammersmith Odeon at the "Another Beatles Christmas Show".

Unusual musical instruments were a feature. The battery-operated Clavioline keyboard (as used by the Tornados) is heard on "Keep Movin'", but is also heard prominently on their previous disc before Meek, "Sounds Like Locomotion". Al Holmes played the lead melody on flute throughout "The Spartans".

1966 was the first year the group released no singles in their home country, although they recorded a second album, again simply titled Sounds Incorporated. This was released on EMI's fledgling Studio 2 label, primarily to show off EMI's mid-1960s advances and developments in stereo recording techniques. Any singles taken off the LP for foreign markets were in that format's standard mono, however, making these unusual items for UK collectors of the group.

By 1967 the band's name had been truncated to "Sounds Inc". The Beatles invited Cameron, Holmes and West to be the saxophone section on their track "Good Morning Good Morning", from the album Sgt. Pepper's Lonely Hearts Club Band. After this guest appearance, Sounds Inc left EMI and released a solitary single on the Polydor label. Titled "How Do You Feel", it was their first single release to feature vocals.

The group began to disintegrate in the late 1960s. Drummer Tony Newman left to work as a session musician and at one stage joined the Jeff Beck Group. He later joined Reid Hudson and James Black to form British/Canadian power trio May Blitz. 

For the remaining members of Sounds Inc, Cameron's departure for a career in A&R left a gap, which was filled by Terry Fogg (percussionist and drummer) and Trevor White, the band's first true vocalist. The group soldiered on, moving to and mainly playing in Australia for their final years together. Their act became more middle-of-the-road, exemplified in their final LP, which was released in many territories but not the UK, containing more vocals than instrumentals. Sounds Inc finally broke up in 1971.

Discography

Singles
August 1961: "Emily" / "Mogambo" – Parlophone R4815
November 1962: "Sounds Like Locomotion" / "Taboo" – Decca 11540
February 1963: "Go" / "Stop" – Decca F 11590
August 1963: "Keep Movin'" / "Order of the Keys" – Decca F 11723
March 1964: "The Spartans" / "Detroit" – Columbia DB 7239 #28. UK.
July 1964: "Spanish Harlem" / "Rinky Dink" – Columbia DB 7321 #34. UK.
November 1964: "William Tell" / "Bullets" – Columbia DB 7404
April 1965: "Time for You" / "Hall of the Mountain King" – Columbia DB 7545
August 1965: "My Little Red Book" / "Justice Neddi" – Columbia DB 7676
October 1965: "I'm Comin' Through" / "On The Brink" – Columbia DB 7737
October 1967: How Do You Feel / Dead As A Go-Go – Polydor 56209

EPs
 August 1964: Top Gear – "Detroit" / "Spanish Harlem" / "Top Gear" / "The Spartans" – Columbia SEG 8360

Albums
 June 1964: Sounds Incorporated – "William Tell"/"Fingertips"/"I'm in Love Again"/"Rinky Dink/Bullets"/"Last Night"/"Sounds Like Movin'"/"One Mint Julep"/"Ready Teddy"/"Crane"/"Maria"/"Light Cavalry" – Columbia SX 3531
 November 1966: Sounds Incorporated – "Goldfinger"/"Little Bird"/"If We Lived on Top of a Mountain"/"Grab This Thing"/"Yesterday"/"Boil Over"/"What Now My Love"/"Zorba's Dance"/"Bahama Sound"/"On The Rebound"/"The Old and the New"/"Legend of Lyndos"/"Twilight of an Empire" – Studio Two TWO 144

Their recording career is currently covered on various CD sets. Virtually all of their recorded output is available, including rare and unreleased items. All tracks released as singles make up one compilation (The Singles).  Both UK released albums are contained on another collection in stereophonic sound, and their third LP is covered in a specialist UK compilation album of rarer tracks. Many individual cuts spanning the first half of their career, appear on various specialist instrumental compilations.

COMPILATION:
Sounds Incorporated 1993
See For Miles Records CD No SEECD 371
1) The Spartans (1964) / 2) Detroit (1964) / 3) Rinky Dink (1964) / 4) My Little Red Book (1965) / 5) Hall Of The Mountain King (1965)  / 6) One Mint Julep (1964) / 7) Last Night ( 1964) / 8) Crane (1964)  / 9) Emily (1961)  / 10) Mogambo (1961)  / 11) Bullets (1964)  / 12) Spanish Harlem ( 1964) / 13) Little Bird (1966)  / 14) If We Lived On Top Of A Mountain (1966)  / 15) Old and the New (1966) / 16) Grab This Thing ( 1966) / 17) Boil Over (1966)  / 18) I'm Comin Through (1965)  / 19) Fingertips (1964)  / 20) I'm In Love Again (1964)

Their third Decca single "Keep Movin'" / "Order Of The Keys" is most sought-out by collectors, mainly due to being produced by Joe Meek.  The first Sounds Incorporated was issued in both mono and stereo.

Television recordings still exist featuring the group in action, although little if anything exists from the UK archives. They also appeared in Pop Gear, a music revue film made in colour, which has been released on video in recent years.

Band members
Alan "Boots" Holmes (baritone sax/tenor saxophone/flute) – (born Alan F. Holmes, 25 April 1939, Rotherhithe, South East London)
"Major" Griff West (tenor saxophone/flute) – (born David Edward Glyde, 19 December 1940, Barnehurst, Kent)
Barrie Cameron (organ/baritone saxophone) – (born Barrie Cameron-Elmes, 25 October 1939, Erith, Kent Died 11 November 2019)
John St. John (lead guitar) – (born John Gillard, 1 April 1940, Dartford Hospital, Dartford, Kent)
Wes Hunter (bass) – (born Richard Thomas, 17 December 1941, Barnehurst, Kent. Died 4 April 2013, Barnehurst)
Tony Newman (drums) – (born Richard Anthony Newman, 17 March 1943, Southampton, Hampshire)
Trevor White (vocals/keyboard/piano/drums) – (born 3 August 1947, Chelmsford, Essex)
Terry Fogg (drums/percussion) – (born Terrence George Fogg, 25 September 1945, Chesterfield, Derbyshire)

See also
List of rock instrumentals
Sounds Orchestral

References

External links
[ Allmusic.com biography by Steve Huey]

Beat groups
English pop music groups
Musical groups established in 1961
Musical groups disestablished in 1971
1961 establishments in England